Art Baker (born November 30, 1929) is a former American football coach. He served as the head football coach at Furman University (1973–1977), The Citadel (1978–1982) and East Carolina University (1985–1988). Baker is a 1948 graduate of Edmunds High School (now Sumter High School) in Sumter, South Carolina and a 1953 Presbyterian College graduate and also was a former assistant football coach there. Baker played football for the Blue Hose from 1950 to 1952, starting at halfback his last two years. He was a member of Mu chapter of Pi Kappa Alpha fraternity. Baker is a recipient of Presbyterian's Bob Waters Award. He was an assistant coach for Frank Howard at Clemson from 1965 to 1969. From 1970 to 1972, Baker was an assistant coach at Texas Tech. Baker succeeded Bob King at Furman for the 1973 season. As head coach at Furman Baker hired Dick Sheridan, Jimmy Satterfield and Bobby Johnson as assistants and all later became head coaches at Furman. Baker was an assistant coach in 1984 for Bobby Bowden at Florida State. He was Associate Athletics Director for Development and Gamecock Club Director at the University of South Carolina for six and a half years before retiring on June 30, 1995.

Family
Baker is a native of Sumter, South Carolina. He married Edith Edens of Dalzell, South Carolina. They have four children and four grandchildren.

Head coaching record

References

Place of birth missing (living people)
1929 births
Living people
American football halfbacks
The Citadel Bulldogs football coaches
Clemson Tigers football coaches
East Carolina Pirates football coaches
Florida State Seminoles football coaches
Furman Paladins football coaches
Presbyterian Blue Hose football coaches
Presbyterian Blue Hose football players
Texas Tech Red Raiders football coaches
South Carolina Gamecocks athletic directors
Sportspeople from Sumter, South Carolina